The International Committee of Architectural Critics (- CICA) is a non-profit organization of international architecture critics, and was founded in Mexico City on October 26, 1978, during the 13th World Kongress of the Union internationale des architectes (UIA). The CICA is headquartered nearby the UIA in Paris. Paris was also the residence of Pierre Vago, who was head of the organization for years. The seat of the secretary was originally located in Buenos Aires, residence of Jorge Glusberg, but can be transferred per decret to any other place worldwide according to the residence of the chairmen.

Founding members of the CICA were Pierre Vago, Bruno Zevi, Max Blumenthal, Mildred Schmertz, Blake Huges, Jorge Glusberg, Julius Posener and others.

CICA awards 
All awards of the association were originally called CICA Award. Since 2003 they have been named after the foundation members. The CICA Book Award was the first award of the CICA and was awarded at the 14th UIA World Congress in 1981.

CICA special awards were awarded to the China Architecture & Building Press (CABP) and to Springer-Verlag for the "World Architecture: A Critical Mosaic 1900-2000" series.

Selected prize winners in alphabetical order
 ARK, The Finnish Architectural Review (Finland); CICA Pierre Vago Award for Architectural Journalism 2003
 Marco Casagrande; for conceptual and artistic architecture   
 Alan Colquhoun
 Roger Connah
 William Curtis
 Arthur Drexler; first winner of the CICA Award for a Preface or Introduction to an Exhibition Catalogue
Elizabeth Farrelly
 Geoffrey Jellicoe
 James Marsden Fitch and Kenneth Frampton; first winners of the CICA Prize for Journalism
 Heinrich Klotz
 David Leatherbarrow; CICA Bruno Zevi Book Award
 Mohsen Mostafavi; CICA Bruno Zevi Book Award
 Manfredi Nicoletti; first winner of the CICA Book Award
 OASE journal (Netherlands); CICA Pierre Vago Award for Architectural Journalism 2011
 Terence Riley/Barry Bergdoll; CICA Julius Posener Award 2003 for an architectural exhibition catalogue text
 Laura P. Spinadel; "CICA Urban planning Award 2015"

References

Architecture organizations
International organizations based in France
Critics associations
Organizations based in Paris
1978 establishments in France